Nirad Vinod Solanki (born November 1988)  is a British businessman, publican, property developer, and serial entrepreneur. He is the founder of a Leicestershire-based brewery company named Elmesthorpe Brewery Company which operates as a supply and fulfillment company to his own group of pubs and many other local bars.

Education 

In 2000, Nirad studied in England where he attended King Edward's School for boys in Edgbaston, Birmingham. He later took up his undergraduate studies in The Czech Republic where he studied Dentistry at Univerzita Karlova in Prague, Czech Republic.

Nirad studied dentistry in Prague for a total of four years, before he made the difficult decision to terminate his studies to become a dentist at the medical faculty and decided to come on back over to England. It was whilst he was at this university he was given his nickname, 'Niri', which inspired the name of his new flame-grilled chicken restaurant inside of the New Baron bar, titled Niri Niri's.

Career 

Although he now resides in Leicester, with a main focus on property development, English pubs and bars, and brewing beers and ales, Solanki still owns two bars in Prague in The Czech Republic. He is also a fully-qualified pilot, real estate investor, and an owner of a small venture capital company.

Nirad opened his first public house in England in Rugby, Warwickshire back in 2016. He later opened his second  pub in the village of Stoney Stanton in Leicestershire. Following the opening of his second pub in Leicestershire, he opened a third pub, this time in Tewkesbury, Gloucestershire.

The serial entrepreneur confirmed his plans in September 2018 to The Leicester Mercury that he would be opening his fourth site, a gin and rum lounge in the West End of Leicester city centre which would open in the same month.

In March 2019, it was revealed that Nirad had secured his fifth site by successfully purchasing Hinckley's popular town bar, The Baron of Hinckley, from Tim Martin's British pub chain, Wetherspoons. He officially re-opened the doors to the former Wetherspoons pub in October 2019 as The New Baron of Hinckley.

In April 2020, Nirad made a television appearance on the BBC's property auction and renovation show, Homes Under the Hammer, where he discussed his plans to demolish a newly purchased property of his, an arson-hit former mixed-martial arts building on Upper Clough Street in Hanley, Staffordshire, which will become a newly developed seven-storey tower block.

At the start of December in 2020, Solanki made headlines in both local newspapers and national newspapers where he gained recognition and publicity for applying to convert the ex-Wetherspoons bar, The New Baron of Hinckley, into a place of worship named 'The Church of New Baron' and start his own religion, when Hinckley was placed in Tier 3 coronavirus restrictions which meant that pubs had to remain closed amidst the coronavirus pandemic in England, whilst churches and other places of worship could remain open.

In March and April 2021, Nirad and his wife and business partner, Payal Solanki, acquired two new locations for the brewery in Stoke-on-Trent and Melton Mowbray. In June 2022, Solanki acquired a pub and hotel in Nuneaton town centre, and yet another former Wetherspoons pub, this time in Paignton, Devon, in the same town as his seven-bedroom-hotel in the nearby seafront.

Personal life 
He lives in Leicester with his wife and business partner, Payal Solanki and their four children.

References 

1988 births
Living people
British brewers
English brewers
English company founders
People educated at King Edward's School, Birmingham
21st-century English businesspeople
Charles University alumni